National Bank of Commerce may refer to:

 National Bank of Commerce (Birmingham), owned by Alabama National BanCorporation, taken over by RBC Bank in 2008
 National Bank of Commerce (Kansas City)
 National Bank of Commerce, Lincoln, Nebraska, part of First Commerce Bancshares, taken over by Wells Fargo Bank in 2000
 National Bank of Commerce (Memphis)
 National Bank of Commerce (Mississippi) (which became Cadence Bank)
 National Bank of Commerce in New York
 National Bank of Commerce, Superior, Wisconsin, founded 1934, part of Natcom Bancshares
 National Bank of Commerce (Tanzania)
 National Bank of Commerce (Uganda), Closed and liquidated in 2012

See also
National Bank of Commerce Building (disambiguation)